The 1980 LFF Lyga was the 59th season of the LFF Lyga football competition in Lithuania.  It was contested by 18 teams, and Granitas Klaipeda won the championship.

League standings

References
RSSSF

LFF Lyga seasons
football
Lith